Nathan Ngai Han Osborne (born 29 June 1995) is a Canadian male badminton player. In 2013, he won gold medals at the Pan Am Junior Badminton Championships in mixed doubles and team events. In 2016, he won a silver medal at the Pan Am Badminton Championships in men's doubles event partnered with Josephine Wu.

Achievements

Pan Am Championships
Mixed Doubles

Pan Am Junior Championships
Boys' Doubles

Mixed Doubles

References

External links 
 
 Canada Games 2015

Living people
1995 births
Canadian male badminton players